Kamya Panjabi is an Indian film and television actress popular for playing antagonist roles in TV soaps. She participated in Bigg Boss 7 in 2013. She joined the Indian National Congress party on 27 October 2021.

Career 
Panjabi became known for portraying negative roles in Indian television serials like Reth, 
Astitva...Ek Prem Kahani and Banoo Mein Teri Dulhann. Panjabi has also played positive roles in Piya Ka Ghar, Maryada: Lekin Kab Tak and Kyun Hota Hai Pyaar.

She was part of the second season of Comedy Circus comedy show on Sony TV and participated in Bigg Boss 7 in Colors TV.

Panjabi featured in minor roles in Bollywood films such as Kaho Naa Pyaar Hai, Na Tum Jaano Na Hum, Yaadein, Phir Bhi Dil Hai Hindustani and Koi Mil Gaya. In 1997, she featured in a music video called Mehndi Mehndi, and was also part of the music video Kala Shah Kala by Anamika.

In 2019, Panjabi made her theatre debut in the play Pajama Party with fellow television actress Kavita Kaushik.

Personal life 
During her time in Bigg Boss 7, Panjabi developed a close friendship with television actress Pratyusha Banerjee. Following Banerjee's suicide, Panjabi released a film based on her life and was sued by Banerjee's former boyfriend.

Panjabi married Bunty Negi in 2003. She gave birth to her daughter Aara in 2009. They divorced in 2013.

She dated television actor Karan Patel but they broke up in 2015.

Panjabi married her boyfriend, a Delhi-based doctor Shalabh Dang, on 10 February 2020. Shalabh had a son from his previous marriage, Ishaan. Kamya and Shalabh are now parents to both Aara and Ishaan.

Politics 
Punjabi joined the Congress party on 27 October 2021.

Television

Awards and nominations

References

External links

 

Living people
Indian television actresses
21st-century Indian actresses
Indian soap opera actresses
Actresses from Mumbai
Bigg Boss (Hindi TV series) contestants
1979 births
Actors from Mumbai